Kaizhou or Kai Prefecture may refer to:

Kaizhou District, Chongqing, China, formerly known as Kai County
Kaizhou, a former prefecture in roughly modern Kaizhou District, Chongqing, China
Kaizhou, a former prefecture in roughly modern Kaiyang County, Guiyang, China
Kaizhou, a former prefecture in roughly modern Fengcheng, Liaoning, China
Kaizhou, a name for the former Chan Prefecture in roughly modern Puyang County, Henan, China